Zdzisław Jachimecki (Lwów, 7 July 1882 – 27 October 1953, Kraków) was a Polish historian of music, composer, professor at the Jagiellonian University and the Kraków Music Academy, and member of the Polish Academy of Learning.

Life

 
Born in Lwów in 1882, in 1904–5 he studied counterpoint with Arnold Schönberg in Vienna.

Partial bibliography
 Mozart. W 150 rocznicę urodzin (1906)
 Hugo Wolf (1908)
 Józef Haydn (1910)
 Ryszard Wagner (1911)
 Wspomnienia Kurpińskiego (1911)
 Artega i Wagner jako teoretycy dramatu muzycznego (1912)
 Muzyka na dworze króla Władysława Jagiełły, 1424–1430 (1915)
 Moniuszko (1921)
 Fryderyk Chopin (1927)
 Na marginesie pieśni studenckiej z XV-go wieku (1930)
 Nieuwzględnione dotychczas źródło melodii Bogurodzicy (1930)
 Średniowieczne zabytki polskiej kultury muzycznej (1930)
 "Chopin, Fryderyk Franciszek," Polski słownik biograficzny, vol. III, Kraków, Polska Akademia Umiejętności, 1937, pp. 420–26.
 Mikołaj Gomółka i jego poprzednicy w historii muzyki polskiej (1946)
 Muzykologia i piśmiennictwo muzyczne w Polsce (1948)
 Chopin, rys życia i twórczości (1947)
 Z pism (1957–1961, 3 volumes)
 Władysław Żeleński (1959)

See also
List of Poles
Chopin

References

External links
 

1882 births
1953 deaths
Polish musicologists
Academic staff of Jagiellonian University
Polish composers
Writers from Lviv
Academic staff of the Academy of Music in Kraków
Lviv Conservatory alumni
20th-century musicologists
Musicians from Lviv
Chopin scholars